Vivti is a highly endangered language of Vanuatu, presumably a Malekula Interior language.

References

Malekula languages
Languages of Vanuatu